Magnitogorskii Rabochii (Magnitogorsk Worker) is a regional socio-political daily newspaper, published in Magnitogorsk by the government of the Chelyabinsk Oblast and the administration of the city; its circulation rose from 3 000 in 1930 to 20 000 by 1932 and 30 000 by 1934 – today it has a circulation of 51 000 per week.

References

Literature
 Stephen Kotkin. Magnetic Mountain: Stalinism as a Civilization. — University of California Press, 1997. — PP. 62, 230, 316–318, 367, 595. — 727 p. — .
 Victoria E. Bonnell, Ann Cooper, Gregory Freidin. Russia at the Barricades: Eyewitness Accounts of the August 1991 Coup. — Routledge, 2015. — PP. xix, 322–328. — 393 p. — .
 Стародубова Олеся Юрьевна (2015). Деятельность рабочих корреспондентов Магнитогорска в годы Великой Отечественной войны // Проблемы истории, филологии, культуры, 4 (50), 174–181.

1930 establishments in Russia
Newspapers established in 1930
Russian-language newspapers published in Russia
1930 establishments in the Soviet Union